The  was a limited express service in Japan which ran between Kagoshima-Chūō Station and Yoshimatsu Station via the Kagoshima Main Line, Nippō Main Line, and Hisatsu Line. It was operated by Kyushu Railway Company (JR Kyushu). Its final run was on 21 March 2022.

Schedule
There were two return services per day. All trains stopped at both Osumi-Yokogawa and Kareigawa Stations for about 5 minutes. Some trains stopped at Ryugamizu Station for about 4 minutes for a view of Sakurajima. (Passengers could not alight Ryugamizu Station.)

Rolling stock
The train was formed of two specially converted diesel multiple unit (DMU) cars, KiHa 147-1045 and KiHa 47-8092. Initially, the train consisted of KiHa 147-1045 as reserved seating car 1 and KiHa 140-2066 as non-reserved seating car 2. From January 2006, a third car, KiHa 47-8092, was converted for use as reserved seating car 1, with KiHa 147-1045 as non-reserved seating car 2. KiHa 140-2066 was used as a spare car to make 3-car formations at busy periods, but was later rebuilt as a third car for use in the Ibusuki no Tamatebako DMU set, returning to service in March 2012.

KiHa 147-1045 and KiHa 140-2066 were converted at JR Kyushu's Kokura Works. 
KiHa 47-8092 was converted at JR Kyushu's Kagoshima Depot. The set is based at Kagoshima Depot.

Exterior
The train was painted all-over black, with deep panorama side windows in the center of each car.

Interior
The trains featured totally new interiors finished in fire-resistant wood with reclining seats and improved air conditioning.

History
The Hayato no Kaze service was introduced on 13 March 2004, coinciding with the opening of the Kyushu Shinkansen. The train made its final run on 21 March 2022, and thereafter the cars will be refurbished into a new limited express service, the Two Stars 4047. The new Two Stars 4047 service is scheduled to begin in Fall 2022 and will run between Takeo Onsen and Nagasaki.

See also
 Joyful Train

References

Named passenger trains of Japan
Railway services introduced in 2004
2004 establishments in Japan
Railway services discontinued in 2022
2022 disestablishments in Japan
Kyushu Railway Company